Renca is a commune of Chile located in Santiago Province, Santiago Metropolitan Region. It was founded on 6 May 1894.

Demographics
The population grew by 3.5% (4,500 people) between the 1992 and 2002 censuses. Its 2006 projected population was 134,690.

Statistics
Average annual household income: US$17,278 (PPP, 2006)
Population below poverty line: 19.2% (2006)
Regional quality of life index: 63.39, low, 49 out of 52 (2005)
Human Development Index: 0.709, 112 out of 341 (2003)

Administration
As a commune, Renca is a third-level administrative division of Chile administered by a municipal council, headed by an alcalde who is directly elected every four years. The communal council has the following members:
 Víctor Barahona Ugarte (UDI)
 Nora Contreras Canales (UDI)
 Renato Estay Cabrera (UDI)
 Cristián Rojas Pizarro (IND)
 Berta Roquer Casanova (PDC)
 Teresa Cordero Villarroel (PPD)
 Cristián Sandoval Saavedra (PDC)
 Silvia Contreras Morales (PC)

Within the electoral divisions of Chile, Renca is represented in the Chamber of Deputies by Karla Rubilar (RN) and María Antonieta Saa (PPD) as part of the 17th electoral district, (together with Conchalí and Huechuraba). The commune is represented in the Senate by Guido Girardi Lavín (PPD) and Jovino Novoa Vásquez (UDI) as part of the 7th senatorial constituency (Santiago-West).

References

External links

  Municipality of Renca

Populated places in Santiago Province, Chile
Communes of Chile
Geography of Santiago, Chile
Populated places established in 1894
1894 establishments in Chile